The River Taw rises at Taw Head, a spring on the central northern flanks of Dartmoor, crosses North Devon and at the town of Barnstaple, formerly a significant port, empties into Bideford Bay in the Bristol Channel, having formed a large estuary of wide meanders which at its western end is the estuary of the River Torridge.

Course
As a stream the Taw heads north and gives its name to the villages of South Tawton and North Tawton. Headwaters add to the size from a number of two major upper course tributaries including the Lapford Yeo and Little Dart River. Along the middle course the Taw receives the River Mole (distributary of the River Bray and a second Yeo), which all rise on upland Exmoor to the north-east. The river drains a variable width basin as one of many rivers in the strongly agricultural county, the river has a rolling valley surrounded by (in order of frequency of occurrence) animal pasture, cultivated fields and woodland until near its end.

The Tarka Trail named after Tarka the Otter follows much of the river's course.

List of bridges
The following is a list of bridges over the River Taw listed going upstream from the estuary at Barnstaple. The left bank of a river is that on the left of a traveller progressing downstream.

Tidal section
The river shares the large tidal ranges of the Bristol Channel and daily changes of water depth of 6 m to 8 m are common near its mouth. This effect can also be seen in changes to the tidal-estuarine basin, which is 18  km long. The tidally-influenced river starts at Newbridge, 4 km south of Barnstaple, where the river's width is approximately 20 m.  The channel's width increases dramatically over the next 8 km, reaching 1 km by Fremington.

At Barnstaple the Taw is joined by the (Barnstaple) Yeo, which is tidal for a short distance inland.  Seawards of Fremington, the small River Caen joins the river on its north bank, the river of Braunton. This tributary was made navigable on its main lower course as the Braunton Canal in the early 19th century.

River legacy
The Taw also gives its name to Bishop's Tawton just before passing through the only town on its route, Barnstaple.  The Long Bridge here, originally medieval, is the second-lowest bridging point of the Taw.  Work finished in 2007 on the long-awaited 'downstream bridge', part of the Barnstaple Western Bypass and now the Taw's lowest crossing point; it was opened in May 2007.  Seawards of Barnstaple, the river's journey is blocked by the large dune complex of Braunton Burrows, hence its late diversion south-westward and shared estuary mouth with the River Torridge across Zulu Bar sandbanks and out into Barnstaple (or Bideford) Bay.

The second lowest port on the Taw is Fremington.  Between the mid-19th and mid-20th centuries its tidal quay was the busiest port (tonnage) between Bristol and Lands End, mainly as it was a handy landing point for Welsh coal shipped across the Bristol Channel which could be distributed around the south-west peninsula by train (track finally closed 1987).  The lowest port (or at least jetty) can be found at Yelland.  The site of a coal-fired power station (closed 1984; demolished 1989), it still is used as a tanker-distribution centre for commercial and domestic petrol and diesel deliveries.  The oil storage tanks here are filled from coastal lighters.

Flooding
The flooding of the Taw in August 1983 and the destruction of the sand dune causeway to Crow Island at the southern tip of Braunton Burrows was the inspiration for Ted Hughes' poem to commemorate the christening of Prince William, son of King Charles III - Rain-Charm for the Duchy.

Rail links
Local rail and road routes follow the river from Barnstaple through the centre of the county.

The Southern Railway built a series of 4-6-2 steam locomotives named after various places within the West Country. The locomotive that honours the Taw Valley is preserved in its rebuilt form on the Severn Valley Railway carrying its post-nationalisation number 34027.

External links

 Current river level at Umberleigh
 Webcam view of River Taw running under Barnstaple's Long Bridge
 Tide times and heights for the Taw's mouth
Environment Agency: Taw and North Devon Streams Catchment Abstraction Management Strategy.  Map p.6
 Fishing: River Taw Fisheries Association

Notes and references
Notes 
  
References

Estuaries of England
Taw, River